Berneuxia is a genus of flowering plants belonging to the family Diapensiaceae.

Its native range is Southeastern Tibet to Southern Central China.

Species:

Berneuxia thibetica

References

Diapensiaceae
Ericales genera
Taxa named by Joseph Decaisne